The 2015 Categoría Primera B season (officially known as the 2015 Torneo Águila season for sponsorship reasons) was the 26th season since its founding.

Format
16 teams competed in this Categoría Primera B season, a decrease from 18 in the last season due to the expansion of the Categoría Primera A to 20 teams starting from this season and the realization of a special promotion tournament to promote 2 additional teams to the Primera A at the start of the season. The Primera B tournament itself changed to a year-round competition with the 16 teams playing the other teams twice on a home-and-away basis and playing a regional rival twice more for a total of 32 matches. The top eight teams after the thirty-two rounds advanced to the Semifinal round where the eight teams were sorted into two groups of four and played a double Round-robin tournament group stage. Both group winners earned promotion to the Categoría Primera A and also advanced to the Final round, which consisted of two legs and decided the season winner.

Teams

a: Only competed in the Promotion tournament.
b: América hosted their home games between February and August at Estadio Hernando Azcárate Martínez in Buga and Estadio de Techo in Bogotá due to the closure of the Estadio Pascual Guerrero for the 2015 IAAF World Youth Championships.
c: Depor hosted their home games between February and August at Estadio Cacique Jamundí in Jamundí due to the closure of the Estadio Pascual Guerrero for the 2015 IAAF World Youth Championships.

Promotion tournament

The promotion tournament, which decided the two Primera B teams that would play in Categoría Primera A for its 2015 season was played from 14 to 21 January in Bogotá by DIMAYOR's eight "A-Class" associates that were in Categoría Primera B at the time. Those eight teams were split into two groups of four teams, where they played each team in their group once. Cúcuta Deportivo and Cortuluá finished on top of each group and earned promotion to the Categoría Primera A.

Group A

Notes

Group B

Primera B tournament

First stage

Standings

Results

Regular matches

Regional derbies (Rounds 8 & 24)

Semifinals
The Semifinal stage began on 8 November and ended on 30 November. The eight teams that advanced from the first round were sorted into two groups of four teams. Atlético Bucaramanga and Fortaleza topped their groups, advancing to the finals and being also promoted to the Categoría Primera A for the 2016 season.

Group A

Group B

Finals

Top goalscorers

Source: DIMAYOR

Aggregate table

References

External links 
 DIMAYOR's official website 

Categoría Primera B seasons
1
Colombia